Mar Thoma III was the third metropolitan bishop who was the 3rd Metropolitan of the Malankara Church in India  for a brief period from 1686 to 1688.

Introduction
On the southwestern coast of India lies a small state known as Kerala. It was here in the first century, Thomas the Apostle arrived to preach the gospel. Some of the Jews and locals became followers of Jesus of Nazareth. They were known as Malabar Nasrani people and their church as Malankara Church.  They followed a unique Hebrew-Syriac Christian tradition which included several Jewish elements and Indian customs.

Early life
Kuravilangad is a town located in the Kottayam district of Kerala, South India. The town is situated in the Meenachil Taluk, about 22 km north of Kottayam. Pakalomattom family was one of the oldest families at  Kuravilangad. The third Mar Thoma was from this family.  He grew up as a man of prayer.

Consecration
Mar Thoma II died suddenly on 14 April 1686, and he was buried inside Niranam church. The leaders of the Malankara Church selected Mar Thoma III as his successor. At that time Mar Ivanios Hidayuttulla who arrived in Kerala in 1685 was the only bishop in Malankara. So Mar Ivanios consecrated Mar Thoma in 1686.

Administration
Malankara church had comparatively a peaceful time during his tenure. It was during this time some members of Karingachira parish joined the Catholics. But majority of them supported Mar Thoma III and rejected the authority of Roman bishop Joseph Sebastani.

In those days traveling from one place to another was very tedious and it was mainly by river. Yet Mar Thoma III tried to visit as many parishes as possible.

Last days
Kadampanad is a very fertile land near Adoor in the Pathanamthitta district. Christians there believe that they came from Nilakkal (a first-century Christian settlement) and built a church at a place called ‘’Nilakkal Mukal’’ there in AD 325 known as St. Thomas church. Later it was moved to the present position and was named St. George's Valiyapally.  Later on renamed as St Thomas Orthodox Cathedral, Kadampanad and recently was made a Marthoman Pilgrim centre by the Orthodox Syrian Church.

It was to this church, Mar Thoma made a visit in 1688. While he was there, he had a sudden death on 21 April 1688 and was interred there.

See also
 Malankara Orthodox Syrian Church
 Mar Thoma Church
 Malankara Jacobite Syriac Orthodox Church
 Kadampanad Church

References

Further reading
Mathew, N. M. Malankara Marthoma Sabha Charitram (History of the Marthoma Church), Volume 1 (2006), Volume II (2007), Volume III (2008). Pub. E.J.Institute, Thiruvalla.

Oriental Orthodoxy in India
People from Kottayam district
Indian bishops
Pakalomattam family
1688 deaths
Year of birth unknown
Syriac Orthodox Church bishops
Christian clergy from Kottayam
17th-century Indian scholars
Malankara Orthodox Syrian Church bishops